Oxelytrum discicolle is a species of carrion beetle in the family Silphidae. It is found in Central America, North America, and South America.

References

Silphidae
Articles created by Qbugbot
Beetles described in 1836